The 1974 Roanoke International, also known as the Roanoke Invitational Tennis Tournament,  was a men's tennis tournament played on indoor carpet courts at the Roanoke Civic Center in Roanoke, Virginia, in the United States that was part of the 1974 USLTA Indoor Circuit. It was the third edition of the event and was held from January 17 through January 21, 1974. First-seeded Jimmy Connors won his third consecutive singles title at the event and earned $5,000 first-prize money.

Finals

Singles
 Jimmy Connors defeated  Karl Meiler 6–4, 6–3
 It was Connors' 2nd singles title of the year and the 19th of his career.

Doubles
 Vitas Gerulaitis /  Sandy Mayer defeated  Ian Crookenden /  Jeff Simpson 7–6, 6–1

References

External links
 ITF tournament edition details

Roanoke International
Roanoke International
Roanoke International